State Route 314 (SR 314), also known as Parksville Road, is a  state highway in Polk County, Tennessee, connecting the town of Benton with the community of Parksville and the Cherokee National Forest.

Route description

SR 314 begins in Parksville at an intersection with US 64/US 74 (Ocoee Scenic Byway/SR 40) just north of Ocoee Dam No. 1 (Parksville Dam). It goes north through farmland along the western edge of the Cherokee National Forest before curving to the west and entering Benton. SR 314 then comes to an end at an intersection with US 411 (SR 33). The entire route of SR 314 is a two-lane Highway.

Major intersections

References

314
Transportation in Polk County, Tennessee